Dicranophorus is a genus of rotifers belonging to the family Dicranophoridae.

The genus has almost cosmopolitan distribution.

Species:
 Dicranophorus alcimus Harring & Myers, 1928 
 Dicranophorus artamus Harring & Myers, 1928

References

Ploima
Rotifer genera